The 1981 Miracle Indoor Championships, also known as the Melbourne Indoor Championships,  was an Association of Tennis Professionals men's tournament played on indoor carpet courts in the Frankston suburb of Melbourne, Victoria, Australia. It was the second edition of the tournament, which was part of the  1981 Grand Prix tennis circuit, and was held from 19 October until 25 October 1981. First-seeded Peter McNamara won the singles title after his opponent Vitas Gerulaitis defaulted the match at 5–5 in the final set in a protest against what he viewed as bad umpiring and line judging.

Finals

Singles
 Peter McNamara defeated  Vitas Gerulaitis 6–4, 1–6, 5–5 def.
 It was McNamara's 2nd singles title of the year and the 4th of his career.

Doubles
 Peter McNamara /  Paul Kronk defeated  Sherwood Stewart /  Ferdi Taygan 3–6, 6–3, 6–4

References

External links
 ITF tournament edition details

Miracle Indoor Championships
Miracle Indoor Championships, 1981
Miracle Indoor Championships
Hortico Melbourne Indoor Championships